Bacino di San Giacomo is a reservoir in the Province of Sondrio, Lombardy, Italy.

Lakes of Lombardy